Kang Yue (康月; born 8 October 1991) is a Chinese weightlifter, and World Champion competing in the 75 kg division until 2018 and 87 kg starting in 2018 after the International Weightlifting Federation reorganized the categories.

References

External links
the-sports.org
Profile on IWF site

1991 births
Living people
Chinese female weightlifters
Weightlifters at the 2014 Asian Games
Asian Games medalists in weightlifting
World Weightlifting Championships medalists
Asian Games silver medalists for China
Medalists at the 2014 Asian Games
Universiade medalists in weightlifting
Universiade silver medalists for China
Medalists at the 2011 Summer Universiade
20th-century Chinese women
21st-century Chinese women